Seamus Martin (born 1942) is the retired international editor of The Irish Times and is the brother and only sibling of Diarmuid Martin the Roman Catholic Archbishop of Dublin. He is a former member of board of the Broadcasting Authority of Ireland the State regulatory body for broadcasting in the Republic of Ireland.

Born in Dublin, he was educated at Gormanston College in County Meath and the College of Commerce Rathmines (now part of the Dublin Institute of Technology). He also studied economics at L'Ecole de la Chambre de Commerce et d'Industrie de Paris.

Martin has been one of Ireland's most versatile journalists, having been a leading sports commentator in his younger days in The Irish Press and the Irish Independent, sports editor of the Sunday Tribune and a columnist in the Evening Herald. Later he became Features Editor of The Irish Times, a columnist in that newspaper and afterwards a foreign correspondent who covered the two most important stories of the late 20th century.

As Moscow Correspondent of The Irish Times, he covered the collapse of communism and the dissolution of the Soviet Union. "What gave Martin's work its edge was his acute sense that what was occurring was no simple triumph of western values in an evil empire, but a complex difficult new phase in a nation's history. He brought to his analysis an Irishman's fatalistic sense that politics were both intensely personal and cruelly indifferent to the individual's fate. And he reported on what he saw with a keen awareness that of how the ending of socialism affected the daily lives of ordinary citizens, as emerging oligarchs seized immense wealth." (Terence Brown, The Irish Times- 150 Years of Influence, Bloomsbury 2015)</ref>

As South Africa correspondent, he covered the rise of Nelson Mandela from prisoner to president, the dissolution of the apartheid regime and the arrival of democracy in South Africa. Later he became Editor of the electronic editions of The Irish Times, winning several awards, including the Swiss IP Top award as best international news site in 1998.

As an active Trades Unionist he has been a member of the London-based National Executive Council of the National Union of Journalists (NUJ), Cathaoirleach (Chairperson) of the Irish Council of the NUJ and "Father" of the Irish Times Chapel of the NUJ.

His documentary series Death of an Empire on the fall of the Soviet Union and the rise of the New Russia won Gold at the 2012 "New York Festivals World's Best Radio Programs" Awards.

His novel Duggan's Destiny received favourable reviews in Ireland and the United States, notably from Kirkus Reviews. His memoir Good Times and Bad published by Mercier Press in 2008 has been a bestseller in Ireland and his TV documentaries Martin's Moscow and Time on your hands in Latvia have been widely shown on RTÉ television.

In retirement, he lives in Ireland and spends some months of the year in the Languedoc-Roussillon region of France where he maintains a small house and a smaller vineyard. He continues to work occasionally as a freelance from Russia and elsewhere for The Sunday Business Post and the Irish Examiner as well as for The Irish Times, he was interviewed on Russia Today supporting the EU-sponsored report on the Russia-Georgia war in 2008.

In March 2018, he wrote an opinion piece for The Irish Times concerning the Poisoning of Sergei and Yulia Skripal, in which the headline suggested it was unlikely that Vladimir Putin was responsible for the attack but the article itself did not..

References

Duggan's Destiny Poolbeg Press 1997
Good Times and Bad (From the Coombe to the Kremlin- a memoir) Mercier Press 2008

External links
The Irish Times Website
www.IPtop.com

1942 births
Living people
Irish documentary filmmakers
The Herald (Ireland) people
Irish columnists
Irish Examiner people
Irish Independent people
Irish memoirists
Irish newspaper editors
Irish novelists
Irish sports journalists
People from County Dublin
RTÉ television presenters
Sunday Tribune people
The Irish Press people
The Irish Times people
Business Post people
Alumni of Dublin Institute of Technology
Irish male novelists